Major Daniel Elias Mogot (28 December 1928 – 25 January 1946) was a military officer involved in the Indonesian National Revolution. He was part of a group that established the Tangerang Military Academy and became its first director. He was killed during the Lengkong incident, an attempt to disarm a Japanese army depot in Lengkong.

References
 Saleh, R. H. A. (1995) Akademi Militer Tangerang Dan Peristiwa Lengkong (The Tangerang Military Academy and the Lengkong Incident), Yayasan Pustaka Nusatama, Jakarta

Minahasa people
Indonesian Christians
Indonesian military personnel
1928 births
1946 deaths
People from Manado
People of the Indonesian National Revolution